Zarneh is a city in Ilam Province, Iran.

Zarneh may also refer to:
 Zarneh, Isfahan
 Zarneh, North Khorasan
 Zarneh District, in Ilam Province
 Zarneh Rural District, in Ilam Province